Édouard S. Léger (May 27, 1890 – 1971) was a Canadian businessman and politician in the Province of New Brunswick.

Léger was first elected to the Legislative Assembly in the 1939 New Brunswick general election as the Liberal Party candidate in the multi-member riding of Westmorland County. He was reelected in 1944 and again in 1948. He died in 1971.

References

External links
 Acadien politicians - University of Moncton

1890 births
1971 deaths
20th-century Canadian politicians
20th-century Canadian businesspeople
St. Joseph's College alumni
Businesspeople from New Brunswick
New Brunswick Liberal Association MLAs
People from Westmorland County, New Brunswick
Canadian Roman Catholics
Acadian people